Rhimphalea ochalis is a moth in the family Crambidae. It was described by Francis Walker in 1859. It is found in India, West Malaysia, Borneo, Sumatra, and Indonesia (Java). in lowlands to montane forests (1000 m).

References

Spilomelinae
Moths described in 1859
Moths of Borneo
Moths of Malaysia